Zhu Fangyu is a former professional Chinese basketball player who spent his entire career with the Guangdong Southern Tigers in the Chinese Basketball Association (CBA). He was nicknamed the "Rain of Three-Pointers", due to his ability to sink three-pointers at crucial moments during games. Standing 2.01 meters (6'7") tall, and weighing 104 kilograms (230 pounds), he played the small forward position.

Professional career
During his 18-year career, Zhu helped the Guangdong Southern Tigers win eight CBA titles, which was tied for the most in league history at the time of his retirement. He was named CBA Finals MVP a record-setting four times – in 2005, 2008, 2009, and 2010 – and claimed the CBA's regular season MVP award in 2008 and 2012.

On 19 February 2016, in a game against the Shandong Golden Stars, Zhu became the first player in CBA history to score more than 11,000 career points, after previously becoming the first to surpass the 10,000-point milestone.

Zhu retired at the end of the 2016–17 CBA season as the league's all-time leader in games played (698), points scored (11,165), and three-pointers made (1,607), as well as tied for the most seasons played with the same team (18). He then moved into Guangdong's front office and became general manager for the Southern Tigers.

National team career
Zhu was a longtime member of the Chinese national team. Zhu was the best 3-point shooter on the team, helping the squad win gold at the 2006 Asian Games and 2010 Asian Games, as well as the 2011 FIBA Asia Championship. He also played on Chinese squads that competed in the 2004, 2008, and 2012 Summer Olympics, along with the 2002 and 2006 FIBA World Championships.

Career statistics

CBA statistics
Regular season and Playoffs combined

Personal life
Zhu Fangyu was married to rhythmic gymnast Hu Mei, whom he met at the 2004 Summer Olympics, from 2008 to 2013. They had 2 children before their divorce, which was marred by allegations that he cheated on her.

References

External links
Asia-Basket.com Profile
China.org Profile

1983 births
Living people
Basketball players from Guangxi
Chinese men's basketball players
Guangdong Southern Tigers players
Hakka sportspeople
People from Liuzhou
Small forwards
Olympic basketball players of China
Basketball players at the 2004 Summer Olympics
Basketball players at the 2008 Summer Olympics
Basketball players at the 2012 Summer Olympics
Asian Games medalists in basketball
Asian Games gold medalists for China
Asian Games silver medalists for China
Basketball players at the 2002 Asian Games
Basketball players at the 2006 Asian Games
Basketball players at the 2010 Asian Games
Medalists at the 2002 Asian Games
Medalists at the 2006 Asian Games
Medalists at the 2010 Asian Games
2006 FIBA World Championship players
2002 FIBA World Championship players